Charles Frédéric Kuhlmann (22 May 1803 – 27 January 1881) was a French chemist who patented the reaction for converting ammonia to nitric acid, which was later used in the Ostwald process.

He was both a research scientist and a professor at Université Lille Nord de France. He promoted chemical engineering education for science graduates in Lille and supported the development of École centrale de Lille (IDN).

As an entrepreneur starting in 1829, he established his own chemical company producing sulfuric acid. This company later merged into Pechiney Ugine Kuhlmann group.

References

 Bibliothèque numérique de Lille-Frédéric Kuhlmann

 Obituary of Kuhlmann in La Nature 26 Feb 1881, scanned at google books

1803 births
1881 deaths
People from Colmar
19th-century French chemists
University of Lille Nord de France